Picture Mommy Dead is a 1966 American horror film directed by Bert I. Gordon and starring Don Ameche, Martha Hyer, Susan Gordon and Zsa Zsa Gabor.

Plot
Heiress Susan Shelley thinks her father, Edward, killed her mother, Jessica, years ago. Newly released from an asylum after three years, she is reunited with her father and a new stepmother, Francene, but suspicious goings-on threaten to push her over the edge.

Cast
 Don Ameche as Edward Shelley
 Martha Hyer as Francene Shelley
 Susan Gordon as Susan Shelley
 Zsa Zsa Gabor as Jessica Flagmore Shelley
 Maxwell Reed as Anthony Flagmore
 Wendell Corey as Lawyer Clayborn
 Signe Hasso as Sister René
 Anna Lee as Elsie Kornwald
 Steffi Henderson as 3rd Woman at Eatate Sale 
 Kelly Corcoran as Little Boy at Estate Sale
 Paulle Clark as 1st Woman at Estate Sale
 Marlene Tracy as 2nd Woman at Estate

Production
Gene Tierney was originally announced for a lead role and Hedy Lamarr was signed to support Ameche and Hyer. However, Lamarr was fired from the film when she collapsed during filming from nervous exhaustion. She was replaced by Gabor.

See also
List of American films of 1966

References

External links
 
 Trailer on Vimeo
 Official website

1966 films
1966 horror films
1960s horror thriller films
American horror thriller films
American independent films
Films directed by Bert I. Gordon
Films about dysfunctional families
Films shot in Los Angeles
Embassy Pictures films
1966 independent films
1960s English-language films
1960s American films